Histiodraco is a monotypic genus of marine ray-finned fish, its only known species being Histiodraco velifer, belonging to the family Artedidraconidae, the barbeled plunderfishes. It is native to the Southern Ocean in the waters around Antarctica.

Taxonomy
Histiodraco was first formally described as a genus in 1914 by the English ichthyologist Charles Tate Regan. In 1914 Regan had described a fish, collected on the Terra Nova Expedition led by Captain Robert Falcon Scott under the name Dolloidraco velifer with the type locality given as McMurdo Sound. However, later that year he described the new genus Histiodraco for D. velifer, this species becoming the type species of that genus by monotypy. The generic name is a compound of histion which means "sail" and draco which is likely a reference to the genus Dolloidraco, to which Regan had assigned this species originally and then proposed this genus shortly after describing its sole member. The specific name is also a compound, this time of velum which again means "sail" and fero meaining "to bear", both names alluding to the very high soft rayed part of the dorsal fin.

Description
Histiodraco has a first dorsal fin which contains 2-3 spines and is located over the operculum, the second dorsal fin contains 23-26 soft rays while the anal fin has 15-18 soft rays. The pectoral fin contains 18-21 fin rays. The head has a width which is roughly the same as their depth and the post temporal ridges are well developed. The snout is shorter than the diameter of the eye and the space between the eyes is narrow. The mental barbel, the barbel on the chin which characterises the barbeled plunderfishes, is long and expanded towards its tip, with tapered processes. The upper lateral line has tubed scales at the head end and towards the caudal fin it normally has disc shaped scales, the middle lateral line consist of disc-shaped scales with some tubed scales towards the rear. Histiodraco appears more closely related to Pogonophryne than to Artedidraco  but differs on its less depressed head and high second dorsal fin.

Distribution, habitat and biology
Histiodraco is found in the Southern Ocean where it has been recorded from the eastern Antarctica in the Weddell Sea, MacRobertson Land,the Ross Sea and South Victoria Land. Little is known about this species biology.

References

Artedidraconidae
Monotypic fish genera
Fish described in 1914